Summers are one of the four seasons.

Summers may also refer to:

People
 Summers (surname)

Places
 Summers, Arkansas
 Summers, West Virginia, in Doddridge County
 Summers County, West Virginia

Other
 Summers (owarai), a Japanese comedy duo

See also 
 Summer (disambiguation)
 Justice Summers (disambiguation)